Alfred Koort (29 May 1901 – 28 September 1956) was an Estonian philosopher.

Koort was born in Viljandi. From 1944 until 1951, he was the University of Tartu.

He was a member of Estonian Academy of Sciences.

Awards:
 1939: Order of the Estonian Red Cross, IV class.

Works
 1938 Sissejuhatus filosoofiasse. Tartu: Akadeemiline Kooperatiiv
 1938 Kaasaegset filosoofiat I. Tartu : Akadeemiline Kooperatiiv
 1938 Beiträge zur Logik des Typusbegriffs. Tartu: [s.n.]
 1996. Inimese meetod. (Compiled by Hando Runnel.) Tartu: Ilmamaa

References

1901 births
1956 deaths
Estonian philosophers
University of Tartu alumni
Academic staff of the University of Tartu
Rectors of the University of Tartu
Members of the Supreme Soviet of the Soviet Union
People from Viljandi